The Córdova Cabinet constituted the 23rd cabinet of the Bolivian Republic. It was formed on 17 August 1855, 2 days after Jorge Córdova was sworn-in as the 12th president of Bolivia following the 1855 general election, succeeding the Belzu Cabinet. It was dissolved on 9 September 1857 upon Córdova's overthrow in a coup d'état and was succeeded by the Cabinet of José María Linares.

Composition

History 
Upon his assumption to office, Córdova charged all ministerial portfolios to Juan de la Cruz Benavente as minister general pending the formation of a proper ministerial cabinet. De la Cruz had already been serving as minister of public instruction and foreign affairs in the cabinet of Manuel Isidoro Belzu since 8 November 1854. A full council of ministers was appointed on 17 August 1855, two days later, composed of four ministers. In this cabinet, a new department, material police, was established as part of the Ministry of Finance.

One ex-president, José María Pérez de Urdininea (1828) was a member of this cabinet.

Cabinets

Structural changes

References

Notes

Footnotes

Bibliography 

 

1855 establishments in Bolivia
1857 disestablishments in Bolivia
Cabinets of Bolivia
Cabinets established in 1855
Cabinets disestablished in 1857